The Great Strahov Stadium is a stadium in the Strahov district of Prague, Czech Republic. It was built for displays of synchronized gymnastics on a massive scale, with a field three times as long as and three times as wide as the standard Association football pitch. Its capacity of 250,000 spectators (56,000 seated) made it larger than any current or former sports stadium, and the second largest sports venue ever.

 the stadium is no longer in use for competitive sports events; it is a training centre for Sparta Prague, and used to host pop and rock concerts. The stadium is sited on Petřín Hill overlooking the old city. It can be accessed by taking the Petřín funicular up the hill through the gardens, or by taking tram lines 22, 23 or 25 to Malovanka station.

Construction
Construction began based on plans by the architect Alois Dryák, on a wooden stadium in 1926, which was replaced by concrete grandstands in 1932. Further construction occurred in 1948 and 1975. The playing field, surrounded by seating on all sides, is 63,500 square metres.

The stadium currently serves Sparta Prague as a training centre with 8 football pitches (6 pitches of standard sizes and 2 futsal pitches).

History

The original stadium dates from the First Republic between the World Wars and served as a venue for popular Sokol displays of massive synchronized gymnastics. Construction of the first stadium began in 1926 on the current ground plan for the VIII.-Všesokolský slet. The stadium was modernized in 1932 for the IX.-Všesokolský slet. Both of these displays were attended by Czechoslovak President T. G. Masaryk, who had been a member of Sokol since he was thirteen, on his horse Hektor. The largest attendance was recorded in 1938 on the occasion of the jubilee "World anti-war" X.-Všesokolský slet.

A few months after the end of World War II in Europe, two units of the United States Army played an exhibition game of American football. On September 28, 1945, a crowd of 40,000 watched soldier-athletes of the 94th Infantry Division defeat a team from the XXII Corps, by a score of 6–0.

XI.-Všesokolský slet in 1948 was used as a protest against rising communism. Soon after, the Sokol was dissolved and followed Spartakiades. The Sokol displays were renamed Spartakiads during the communist era. The Spartakiads also took place in the Soviet Union, East Germany and Albania.

Performances with several thousand gymnasts making various complex formations, with some performers performing in synchronization while traditional folk music played overhead, attracted the attention of many visitors. Some of the most popular shows were those of young well-trained recruits who wore only boxer shorts while on the display or women dancing in miniskirts. The groups of volunteer gymnasts (unlike the soldiers, who were ordered to practice and participate) were put together from top level local athletic association members who regularly trained for the show throughout the year prior to the event. The event was held semi-decadally until 1985.

Motor racing also took place in the stadium in the mid-1960s.

The last Spartakiad was held here in 1985. Renewed XII.-Všesokolský slet took place here with the presence of Czech President Václav Havel in 1994. However, the next Sokol venues took place on the smaller stadiums (Stadion Evžena Rošického and Eden Arena). In 1990, Great Strahov Stadium hosted British classic rock group, The Rolling Stones.  The concert had 100,000 spectators, most notably, former President Václav Havel. Since the 90's, the spacious building hosted few events. Weeds and other vegetation grew on the playing surfaces, due to a lack of care. The area was also used for exhibitions and trade fairs, and was also used for exhibition polo games.

At the beginning of the 21st century, there were talks about demolishing the venue.  However, those talks have since diminished. In 2003, part of the stadium, with the financial support of the City of Prague, was reconstructed by AC Sparta Prague. Eight football fields were built, and it is now used as a training centre for Sparta. In 2014, the complex management of the stadium was resolved and it is now owned by the city of Prague.

The 2019 Apple iPhone XR "Color Flood" commercial, which featured large numbers of people running in different colored jumpsuits, was filmed at the stadium.

Concerts
Since 1990, the stadium has been used for rock concerts.

The Rolling Stones – Aug 18, 1990 & Aug 5, 1995 (attendance 100,000 & 127,000 respectively)
Guns N' Roses – May 20, 1992 (attendance 60,000), with Soundgarden and Faith No More
Bon Jovi – Sept 4, 1993 (attendance 30,000) with Billy Idol and Little Angels
Aerosmith – May 27, 1994 (attendance 50,000)  with Extreme
Pink Floyd – Sept 7, 1994 (official attendance 110,000, but eventually another estimated 10,000 people snuck in or pushed into the venue)
Bratři Nedvědové – June 21, 1996 (attendance 60,000)
U2 – Aug 14, 1997 (attendance approx. 62 000)
AC/DC – June 12, 2001 (attendance 25,000), with Rammstein
Ozzfest – May 30, 2002 (attendance 30,000), with Ozzy Osbourne, Tool and Slayer

Future of the stadium
In the last decade several studies have looked at adaptive reuse and preservation of this unique structure. There are plans to convert the extremely large Great Strahov stadium complex into a commercial zone complete with hotels, restaurants and shops. Another proposition was to convert the area into a "leisure mecca for the 21st century". There were plans to rebuild the area as an Olympic village if Prague won a future Olympic bid.  However, the bid for 2016 was unsuccessful.

See also
 Sport in the Czech Republic
 Stadion Evžena Rošického

References

External links
 Photo gallery of the stadium

Sports venues in Prague
Football venues in Czechoslovakia
Athletics (track and field) venues in Czechoslovakia
Music venues in Prague
Strahov
AC Sparta Prague
Petřín
Prague 6
1926 establishments in Czechoslovakia
Sports venues completed in 1926
Music venues completed in 1926
20th-century architecture in the Czech Republic